Startup Disk Creator (USB-creator) is an official tool to create Live USBs of Ubuntu from the Live CD or from an ISO image. The tool is included by default in all releases after Ubuntu 8.04, and can be installed on Ubuntu 8.04. A KDE frontend was released for Ubuntu 8.10, and is currently included by default in Kubuntu installations. 
The KDE and Ubuntu frontend go under the names "usb-creator-kde" and "usb-creator-gtk", respectively.

Features

Install bootloader to USB device

Installation

To install in Ubuntu via apt, use the following commands in the terminal:

$ sudo apt update
$ sudo apt install usb-creator-gtk

Future development
The tool is available for Ubuntu (GNOME [From 11.04 up to 17.04 also their own called Unity]) or Kubuntu (KDE) and also for Windows starting in Ubuntu 10.10 "Maverick Meerkat" but accessible only by inserting the Live CD or DVD into a CD-ROM/DVD-RW drive with Windows running.

See also
List of tools to create Live USB systems

References

External links
Project page at Launchpad (Original Author)
Project page at Launchpad (Ubuntu)
Ubuntu Wiki Page
Ubuntu App Page
Manual Page (since Ubuntu 8.10)
Review 2021

Live USB